Eva Pawlik (4 October 1927 – 31 July 1983) was an Austrian figure skater, show star, actress and commentator. She was the 1948 Olympic silver medalist, the 1948 World silver medalist, and the 1949 European champion.

Early life
Born in 1927, Pawlik was regarded as a child prodigy, able to jump a single Axel and do a large number of spins at the age of four. Before World War II, she was considered an "exceptionally promising 9-year-old Viennese" figure skater in the United States. In Europe, she starred in "The Fairy Tale Of The Steady Tin Soldier" together with World champion Felix Kaspar. This legendary vaudeville number was internationally highly successful, being performed in Vienna, Prague, Budapest, Munich, Bern, Amsterdam, Brussels, Lyon, Paris and London. Pawlik was called the "Shirley Temple on ice". In her teens she would get up at 4 a.m. daily to run to the Vienna ice rink (Wiener Eislaufverein), for practice before going to school. Austrian skaters were impeded in the 1930s and 40s by the fact that there were no indoor skating halls and they were restricted to practicing in winter.

Nazi Germany's absorption of Austria in 1938 and World War II destroyed sportsmen's lives and careers. Pawlik, for example, was due to compete (aged 12) in the singles in the 1940 Winter Olympics, and in the pairs with her later husband Rudi Seeliger. However, they could only take part in domestic competitions, becoming German youth champions, both individually and as a pair team. In addition to that, they became the 1942 Austrian pairs champions (called Ostmark champions at that time due to the fact that Austria did not exist from 1938 to 1945). Drafted into the German Army, Rudi Seeliger was captured by the Red Army and returned to Austria in 1949.

Competitive career
Pawlik´s coaches included the 1914 World silver medalist Angela Hanka, World champion Gustav Hügel, Rudolf Kutzer and Edi Scholdan.

1948 season 

In 1947, Pawlik was rated best European skater and second in the world. However, Austrian skaters were barred from entering European and World competitions at that time. In 1948 she won three silver medals; at the Europeans, at the Olympics and at Worlds. Pawlik entered the 1948 European Championships as the favorite. Nevertheless, she finished second to non-European Barbara Ann Scott from Canada. At the time, skaters from non-European countries could compete at the European Championships. In Sandra Stevenson's opinion, it was "not surprising that North Americans, whose skating activities had not been interrupted" during World War II, "should do well when the sport resumed in 1947. When Eva Pawlik of Austria unsuccessfully challenged Barbara Ann Scott in 1948 one reason given for her failure was that she skated with dirty boots and holes in her tights. The boots were so old that they no longer responded to cleaning and the holes were darned. It was the best she could manage with all the shortages in her country."

In 1948, Pawlik performed in exhibition skating in the United States. She appeared together with U.S. Champion Gretchen Merrill in the Broadmoor Ice Revue, produced by Edi Scholdan in Colorado Springs. She was also asked to appear in a movie starring Gene Kelly. He wanted to combine his dancing with her skating. She declined, as turning professional would have excluded her from the 1949 championships.

1949 season 

In 1949, despite suffering acute appendicitis, Pawlik beat her rival Aja Zanova in Milan to become European champion. In the World Championships held in Paris, Pawlik was lying a close second behind Zanova when one of the heels on her skates broke. Sabotage was suspected, but never proven. The judges did not allow her to continue with borrowed skates and Zanova went on to win. Though having good chances to win the World title one year later, Pawlik decided to turn professional because her parents needed financial support.

Professional career 

Pawlik joined the Vienna Ice Revue and performed a program that was considered by some journalists and figure skating experts to be technically and artistically slightly superior to the free skating of World champion Vrzáňová. Pawlik also played major parts in the productions of two movies featuring the Revue, Spring On The Ice (Frühling auf dem Eis), 1950, and Revue Of Dreams (Traumrevue), 1959. The first is said to have inspired the later double Olympic champion, Ludmilla Belousova, to take up skating.

In 1952, Robert Stolz dedicated his first ice operetta, Eternal Eve (Die ewige Eva), to Eva Pawlik. Morris Chalfen, the boss of the competitor enterprise Holiday On Ice, considered Pawlik Europe's best show star on the ice since the thrice Olympic champion Sonja Henie. Additionally, Pawlik and Seeliger had become one of the world's best professional pair teams. They left the Vienna Ice Revue in 1954 and starred in Hanns Thelen's Scala Eisrevue for some years. In 1958, they returned to the Vienna Ice Revue.

Later life 

In 1961, Pawlik retired from skating and became the first European and first female figure skater to become a TV figure skating commentator. She commentated all European and World Championships in figure skating and the 1964, 1968 and 1972 Olympic Games for the Austrian Broadcasting Corporation (ORF).

In 1973, she began her third profession as a teacher of German and English at a Viennese secondary school (pupils from 10 to 18). In 1954, she earned her doctorate in German and English at the University of Vienna. In 1979, Pawlik became severely ill and died in 1983, four months after her husband.

Legacy

The exhibition "The Vienna Ice Revue. Austria's ambassador of the past" took place at the Bezirksmuseum Wien-Meidling from January to March 2008.

Results

Ladies' singles

Pairs with Seeliger

Filmography

References

Further reading
 Eva Pawlik, Autobiographical article in: Als ich 19 war (When I was 19 years old). Jugend&Volk 1981
 Roman Seeliger, Die Wiener Eisrevue. Ein verklungener Traum (The Vienna Ice Revue. A Dream That Has Faded Away). Hölder-Pichler-Tempsky 1993
 Roman Seeliger, Die Wiener Eisrevue. Einst Botschafterin Österreichs - heute Legende (The Vienna Ice Revue. Austria´s Ambassador Of The Past - Today´s Legend). Bezirksmuseum Wien-Meidling, 2008
 Ingrid Wendl, Eis mit Stil (Ice In A Proper Style). Jugend&Volk 1979
 Ingrid Wendl, Mein großer Bogen (My Great Arch). Böhlau 2002
 Isabella Lechner, Wienerinnen, die lesen, sind gefährlich (Viennese Women That Read Are Dangerous). Chapter "Eva Pawlik". Elisabeth Sandmann, Munich 2012
 Isabella Lechner, Die Wiener Eisrevue (The Vienna Ice Revue). Diploma thesis, University of Vienna, 2008

External links
 
 Eva Pawlik Fanpage

1927 births
1983 deaths
Austrian female single skaters
Olympic silver medalists for Austria
Figure skaters at the 1948 Winter Olympics
Olympic figure skaters of Austria
Figure skating commentators
Austrian film actresses
Actresses from Vienna
Olympic medalists in figure skating
World Figure Skating Championships medalists
European Figure Skating Championships medalists
Medalists at the 1948 Winter Olympics
Figure skaters from Vienna
University of Vienna alumni
20th-century Austrian actresses